What Doesn't Kill You... is the tenth and final studio album recorded by American rock band Blue Cheer. It includes a remake of their song "Just a Little Bit" originally from their album Outsideinside and a cover of the classic blues song "Born Under a Bad Sign." David Fricke has called the album "a strong studio calling card." The album features Pentagram drummer Joe Hasselvander on half of the album's tracks while the other half features original drummer, Paul Whaley. The title alludes to Nietzsche's aphorism "What does not kill me makes me stronger".

Track listing
"Rollin' Dem Bones" (MacDonald, Peterson) – 4:49
"Piece o' the Pie" (MacDonald, Peterson) – 5:06
"Born Under a Bad Sign" (William Bell, Booker T. Jones) – 3:38
"Gypsy Rider" (MacDonald, Peterson) – 4:54
"Young Lions in Paradise" (Dickie Peterson) – 6:49
"I Don't Know About You" (MacDonald, Peterson) – 5:00
"I'm Gonna Get to You" (MacDonald, Peterson) – 6:32
"Maladjusted Child" (MacDonald, Peterson) – 5:08
"Just a Little Bit (Redux)" (Dickie Peterson) – 4:01
"No Relief" (MacDonald, Peterson) – 9:31

Personnel
Dickie Petersonbass guitar, vocals
Duck MacDonaldguitar
Paul Whaleydrums (tracks: 3, 6-9) 
Joe Hasselvanderdrums (tracks: 1, 2, 4, 5, 10)

References

Blue Cheer albums
2007 albums